Down on the Farm is a British television series that has been broadcast on CBeebies since 2015.  It is hosted by JB Gill and Storm Huntley. On 22 July 2018 it was announced that there will be a spin-off show called Down On The Farm Live - it will be hosted by Dan Wilkes and Storm Huntley. JB Gill and Patsy Palmer will also appear as a guest presenters. Down on the Farm is also available on BBC iPlayer for over a year.

References

External links
 

Great

BBC children's television shows
2015 British television series debuts
2010s British children's television series
English-language television shows
CBeebies
British preschool education television series
Television series by BBC Studios